John Tierney is a Gaelic footballer from Knockbride, Cavan.

Playing career

Gaelic football
The Knockbride clubman represented DCU, as well as the Cavan county team at minor, U-21 and senior level in the Dr McKenna Cup, NFL and played left half forward in the Ulster Senior Football Championship final defeat to Tyrone in 2001.

Australian football
Tierney represented the Ireland national Australian rules football team, that won the 2011 Australian Football International Cup and 2010 European Championships in Australian Football. He also captained the Under-17 Ireland international rules football team on a tour to Australia.

References

1982 births
Living people
Alumni of Dublin City University
Cavan inter-county Gaelic footballers
Irish expatriate sportspeople in Australia
Gaelic footballers who switched code
Irish players of Australian rules football
DCU Gaelic footballers